Ahmad Monshi Ghomi, also known as Ghazi Ahmad, was a Persian author and calligrapher. He was the son of Sharaf ed-Din Hossein Ghomi, who was the scrivener of Sam Mirza Safavi in Herat. Ghazi Ahmad was born in 1547 in Qom. When he was 11 years old, he moved with his father to Mashhad and spent 20 years in that city. Under protection of Ibrahim Mirza, he took lessons from the famous masters like Shah Mahmud Nishapuri, Mir Ahmad Mashhadi and Malek Deylami until the age of 31. Ebrahim Mirza was a well-educated man in the field of art and science and some of prominent poets, calligraphers and painters worked in his library. Ghazi Ahmad spent his youth in the art circles of Ebrahim Mirza's court. He had also relations with many painting and calligraphy masters out of Ebrahim mirza's library and because of this he could recounted many details about the artists' lives in the Safavid era. His works, Golestan-e Honar, introduces artists, whom he knew personally or knew about them by other trusted persons. He has other books like Kholassat ot-Tavarikh, which is the history of Safavid dynasty from Safi-ad-din Ardabili to the early period of Abbas I, and also Majma osh-Shoara and Managheb of-Fozala. In 1599, Abbas I got angry at Ghazi Ahmad and ordered his dismissal. After he was dismissed he went to Ghom. In 1607, he met Molana Mohammad Amir Aghili Rostamdari Ardebili, who was a well-known calligrapher in that time. Ghazi Ahmad wrote about him in Golestan-e Honar.

References 

People from Qom

Iranian calligraphers
16th-century writers of Safavid Iran
16th-century Iranian painters
16th-century Iranian writers

1547 births
Year of death missing